Chambord is an iron meteorite found in Quebec.

History
The exact location and the name of the farmer are unknown. When the meteorite was found, it was brought to the attention of the superintendent of Mines for the Province of Quebec who then loaned it to the Geological Survey of Canada for analysis.

Classification
It is a medium octahedrite, IIIAB.

Fragments
The recovered fragment is an irregularly shaped block about  x  x . The entire mass is in the Canadian Meteorite Collection, Geological Survey of Canada, Ottawa.

See also
 Glossary of meteoritics
 Meteorite

References

Meteorites found in Canada
1904 in Canada